Chimidiin Gochoosüren (born 13 April 1953) is a Mongolian wrestler. He competed in the men's freestyle 82 kg at the 1976 Summer Olympics.

References

External links 
 

1953 births
Living people
Mongolian male sport wrestlers
Olympic wrestlers of Mongolia
Wrestlers at the 1976 Summer Olympics
Asian Games medalists in wrestling
Asian Games silver medalists for Mongolia
Wrestlers at the 1978 Asian Games
Medalists at the 1978 Asian Games
People from Arkhangai Province
20th-century Mongolian people
21st-century Mongolian people